Broxholme is a surname. Notable people with the surname include:

 John Broxholme (died 1647), English politician 
 John Franklin Broxholme (1930–2000), pseudonym Duncan Kyle, English thriller writer
 Noel Broxholme (1686–1748), English physician